Masks is the fifth studio album by American metalcore band Eyes Set to Kill. The album was released on September 17, 2013. It is their first album to be released under Century Media Records. It is also their last album to feature screamer and guitarist Cisko Miranda.

Music and lyrics
Phil Freeman of Alternative Press wrote that "Eyes Set to Kill go an overtly metal, even nü-metal direction." In addition, Freeman wrote that "Their riffs are fierce and heavy, laid over powerful grooves, but it's the vocal melodies that pack the most punch."

Critical reception

At Alternative Press, Phil Freeman noted "This is strong work from a band unwilling to be dismissed as a sister-act gimmick."

Track listing

Personnel 

Eyes Set to Kill'''
 Cisko Miranda - unclean vocals, rhythm guitar
 Alexia Rodriguez - clean vocals, lead guitar, acoustic guitar, piano, keyboards, samples
 Anissa Rodriguez - bass guitar
 Caleb Clifton - drums, percussion

Artwork and design
 James Lano - artwork, layout
 Jeremy Saffer - photography

Production
 Steve Evetts - producer, engineer, mixing
 Andrew Wade - producer
 Alan Douches - mastering
 Allan Hessler - engineer
 Alex Lopez - composer, drum engineering
 Kane Churko - composer
 Brandon Saller - composer
 Johnny Andrews - composer
 Fred Archambault - composer

Charts

References 

2013 albums
Eyes Set to Kill albums
Century Media Records albums